Akşehir Grand Mosque is a historical mosque in Akşehir, Turkey.

Location
It faces Akşehir Museum.

History
The exact date of construction is not known, though according to the inscription on the minaret base, it must be in 1213 or earlier. The commissioner of the minaret was Ebu Said İbrahim.  This date coincides with the reign of Kaykaus I (r. 1211–1220) in the Sultanate of Rum. During the reign of  Kayqubad I (r. 1220–1237) of Seljuıks the mosque was enlarged.
The ceramic-tiled mihrab was added later, probably in the 15th century, while both the water fountain on the north wall and the shadirvan in the yard were added in the 19th century during the Ottoman Empire. According to the inscription of the fountain it was commissioned by Yaralı Yusuf of Cihanbeyli in 1811.

The building
Cut stone and rubble stone was used in the construction of the mosque.

Gallery

See also
 List of Turkish Grand Mosques

References

Buildings and structures in Konya Province
Akşehir District
Seljuk mosques in Turkey
Mosques completed in 1213
Akşehir